The 1924 Iowa Hawkeyes football team represented the University of Iowa in the 1924 Big Ten Conference football season. This marks Burt Ingwersen's first season as head coach of the Hawkeyes.

Schedule

References

Iowa
Iowa Hawkeyes football seasons
Iowa Hawkeyes football